Sowlat Mortazavi  (born 5 May 1955) is an Iranian conservative politician and the current Minister of Cooperatives, Labour and Social Welfare of Iran. He is former Vice President of Iran for Executive Affairs and also former Supervisor of Presidential Administration of Iran. 

He is former Mayor of Mashhad. He was elected as the Mayor by the City Council by 19 votes on 20 September 2013 and sworn in on 1 October. Before that, he was under-secretary in Politics of Ministry of Interior during Mostafa Mohammad-Najjar's time as Interior Minister. He was also Mayor of Birjand from 1990 to 1999.

He was appointed as head of Country's Election Headquarters on 17 May 2011. On 20 June 2017, he was suspended from his position as Mayor of Mashhad and all political offices by administrative justice court after he prevented from auditing in the municipality.

References

External links

1955 births
Living people
Society of Devotees of the Islamic Revolution politicians
Mayors of places in Iran
Governors of South Khorasan Province
Association of Muslim Journalists politicians